Yang Tsung-hua was the defending champion, but did not compete in the Juniors this year.

Daniel Berta won in the final 6–1, 3–6, 6–3, against Gianni Mina.

Seeds

Draw

Final eight

Top half

Section 1

Section 2

Bottom half

Section 3

Section 4

External links
Draw

Boys' Singles
2009